The Slovenia women's national basketball team represents Slovenia in international women's basketball competition and is organized by the Basketball Federation of Slovenia (KZS). In 2023, Slovenia will co-host the 39th FIBA Women's EuroBasket along with Israel and they have automatically qualified as co-host.

The women's national team made their debut at the EuroBasket Women 2017.

Competitive record
For results before 1993, see Yugoslavia women's national basketball team.

Olympic Games

FIBA Women's World Cup

EuroBasket Women

Note:Red border indicates host nation

Current roster
Roster for the EuroBasket Women 2021.

}

References

External links
 
FIBA profile
Slovenia National Team – Women at Eurobasket.com

Women's national basketball teams
 
W